Surgeon Vice Admiral Sheila Samanta Mathai, NM, VSM is a serving flag officer in the Indian Navy. She currently serves as the Director General (Organisation & Personnel) of the Armed Forces Medical Services. She is the fourth woman in the Indian Armed Forces to be promoted to a three-star rank, after Surgeon Vice Admiral Punita Arora, Air Marshal Padma Bandopadhyay and Lieutenant General Madhuri Kanitkar.

Early life and education
Mathai was born into an Armed Forces family. Her father was a surgeon in the Army Medical Corps. She attended the Loreto Schools, Kolkata. She lost her parents early and joined the Armed Forces Medical College, Pune (AFMC), her father's alma mater. At AFMC, she completed her MBBS and was awarded the Kalinga Trophy for the best outgoing student.

Military career
Mathai was commissioned in the Indian Navy in 1985. She subsequently did her post-graduation, earning the Doctor of Medicine degree in Pediatrics from the University of Mumbai. She then earned a DM degree in Neonatology, also from the University of Mumbai. She was awarded a Commonwealth Visiting Fellowship to the UK in Neonatology in 2003, and was conferred a Fellowship of the Foundation for Advancement of International Medical Education and Research (FAIMER) in 2014.

Mathai has set up the paediatric departments at INHS Dhanvantari in Port Blair and at the INHS Jeevanti in Goa. She has also set up the neonatal intensive care units in service and cantonment hospitals in Mumbai and Pune. As a Surgeon Commodore, she served as the Professor and Head of Department of Paediatrics at the Armed Forces Medical College, Pune. She subsequently served as the Director & Dean of the Institute of Naval Medicine in Mumbai, an institute headed by her husband in the past.

Flag rank

Mathai was promoted to the rank of Rear Admiral and appointed Command Medical Officer, Eastern Naval Command. She was subsequently appointed Commanding Officer of the naval hospital INHS Asvini in Mumbai. She was in command of the naval hospital during the COVID-19 pandemic. On 31 January 2021, she relinquished command of Asvini, handing over to Rear Admiral Arti Sarin, in a rare event of a change of command between two women flag officers. On 1 February, she took over as the Command Medical Officer of the Western Naval Command.

On 26 August 2021, she was promoted to the rank of Surgeon Vice Admiral, only the fourth woman to be promoted to three-star rank in the Indian Armed Forces. She assumed the post of Director General (Organisation and Personnel) of the Armed Forces Medical Services under the Director General Armed Forces Medical Services (DGAFMS).

Personal life
Mathai is married to a retired officer of the Indian Navy, Surgeon Commodore K. I. Mathai, VSM, a neurosurgeon who served in the navy for 35 years. The couple have a daughter.

Awards and decorations
Mathai has been awarded the Chief of the Naval Staff Commendation Card in 1993, the Vishisht Seva Medal in 2012, and the Nao Sena Medal in 2021.

See also
 Women in the Indian Armed Forces
 Punita Arora
 Padma Bandopadhyay
 Madhuri Kanitkar
 Rajshree Ramasethu
 Arti Sarin

References

Indian Navy personnel
Indian Navy admirals
Female admirals of the Indian Navy
Living people
Women in 21st-century warfare
Women in warfare post-1945
Indian female military personnel
Year of birth missing (living people)
Recipients of the Nau Sena Medal
Recipients of the Vishisht Seva Medal